Events in the year 2021 in Seychelles.

Incumbents

President: Wavel Ramkalawan

Events
Ongoing — COVID-19 pandemic in Seychelles

Deaths
 
17 January – Joevana Charles, politician, member of the National Assembly (born 1955).

References

 
2020s in Seychelles
Years of the 21st century in Seychelles
Seychelles
Seychelles